Robbie Simpson (born 1985) is an English footballer.

Robbie Simpson may also refer to:

Robbie Simpson (rugby league) (born 1975), Australian rugby league player
Robbie Simpson (runner) (born 1991), British long-distance runner

See also
Rob Simpson
Robert Simpson (disambiguation)